Fishvar Rural District is a rural district (dehestan) in the Central District, Evaz County, Fars province, Iran. At the 2006 census, its population (including Fishvar, which was subsequently detached from the rural district and promoted to city status) was 5,920, in 1,046 families; excluding Fishvar, the population (as of 2006) was 719, in 126 families. The rural district has 6 villages.

References 

Rural Districts of Fars Province
Larestan County